Serhat is a Turkish given name for males. People named Serhat include:

 Serhat Akın (born 1981), Turkish footballer
 Serhat Akyüz (born 1984), Turkish footballer
 Serhat Caradee, Turkish-Australian film director
 Serhat Çetin (born 1986), Turkish basketball player
 Serhat Coşkun (born 1987), Turkish volleyball player
 Serhat Gülpınar (born 1979), Turkish footballer
 Serhat Koç (born 1990), Dutch footballer of Turkish descent
 Serhat Ulueren (born 1968), Turkish journalist
 Serhat (singer) (born 1964), Turkish singer, producer and television presenter

See also
 Serhat, Bayramiç

Turkish masculine given names